Nicolas, Count Luckner (12 January 1722, Cham in der Oberpfalz – 4 January 1794, Paris) was a German officer in French service who rose to become a Marshal of France.

Luckner grew up in Cham, in eastern Bavaria and received his early education from the Jesuits in Passau. Before entering the French service, Luckner spent time in the Bavarian, Dutch and Hanoverian armies. He fought as a commander of hussars during the Seven Years' War (1756–1763) in the Hanoverian army against the French. Luckner joined the French army in 1763 with the rank of lieutenant general. In 1784 he became a Danish count.

He supported the French Revolution, and the year 1791 saw Luckner become a Marshal of France. In 1791–92 Luckner served as the first commander of the Army of the Rhine. In April 1792, Rouget de Lisle dedicated to him the Chant de Guerre pour l'Armée du Rhin (War Song of the Army of the Rhine), which was to become better known as the Marseillaise.

As commander of the Army of the North in 1792 he captured the Flemish cities of Menen and Kortrijk, but then had to retreat towards Lille. After the flight of Lafayette (August 1792) he was made generalissimo with orders to build a Reserve Army near Châlons-sur-Marne. However, the National Convention was not satisfied with his progress and Choderlos de Laclos was ordered to support or replace him. Luckner, now over 70 years of age, then asked for dismissal (granted in January 1793) and went to Paris.

He was arrested by the Revolutionary Tribunal and sentenced to death. He died by the guillotine in Paris in 1794.

The carillon of the town hall in the Bavarian town of Cham rings the Marseillaise every day at 12.05 p.m. to commemorate the city's most famous son, Nikolaus Graf von Luckner.

He was the great-grandfather of Count Felix von Luckner (1881–1966), a German naval officer who commanded the famed merchant raider SMS Seeadler (1916–1917) during World War I .

Luckner owned Krummbek Manor in Holstein.

References

 Theodor Heuss: Der Marschall aus der Oberpfalz, in: Schattenbeschwörung. Randfiguren der Geschichte. Wunderlich, Stuttgart und Tübingen 1947; Neuausgabe: Klöpfer und Meyer, Tübingen 1999, 

1722 births
1794 deaths
German Freemasons
People from Cham, Germany
People from the Electorate of Bavaria
Marshals of France
Military leaders of the French Revolutionary Wars
French Republican military leaders of the French Revolutionary Wars
French military personnel of the French Revolutionary Wars
Names inscribed under the Arc de Triomphe
Executed people from Bavaria
People executed by guillotine during the French Revolution
Recipients of the Order of the White Eagle (Poland)